Blue in Heaven were an Irish rock quartet from Churchtown, Dublin, Ireland, active from 1982 to 1989 and led by singer Shane O'Neill. They reformed in 1990 as The Blue Angels. O'Neill later went on to form Supernaut with Dave Long from Into Paradise.

Blue in Heaven released a few singles on U2's Mother Records before being signed to Island Records in 1985, when they released their first album, All The Gods Men, which was produced by Martin Hannett.

Their follow-up, Explicit Material (1986), saw them team up with Island Records chief Chris Blackwell and Eric Thorngren. Their popularity grew thanks to touring with The Chameleons, Echo & the Bunnymen, and The Damned, alongside achieving a minor  hit with "I Just Wanna".

Kieran Kennedy joined and they played concerts for two years. They released an EP on the Solid label, Rock 'n' Roll R.I.P., which was a chronological compilation of their work: a 1983 track ("On and On") produced by The Edge, four from 1987 and a live cover of The Stooges's song "Loose." Kennedy left to start the Black Velvet Band.

Members

Original recording members
Drums - Dave Clarke (later played drums for The Black Velvet Band, Warren Zevon, and currently, for Hothouse Flowers)
Bass - Declan Jones
Guitar, keyboards, vocals - Shane O'Neill
Guitar, keyboards - Eamonn Tynan

Supernaut
In 1997, O'Neill played mostly rhythm electric and acoustic guitar and bass, and sang and wrote words and music with Dave Long, from Into Paradise. Clarke played drums and percussion. Paul McQuillan, who later played and wrote with Hope Sandoval and The Warm Inventions, played electric guitar and  ray gun and released a self-titled album on Dirt Records.  Today, O'Neill runs a recording studio in Dublin.

Additional musicians

Blue Angels
Guitar - Quentin Cowper; he moved to County Clare where he now plays largely traditional Irish music on fiddle and banjo with 'The Fiddle Case' and Ceili Bandits.

Discography

Blue in Heaven

Albums
 All the Gods' Men (1985)
 Explicit Material (1986)

EPs
 Rock 'n' Roll R.I.P. (1988)

Compilation albums
 Live for Ireland (1986) -- "Tell Me" (recorded live during their performance for Self Aid)

Singles
 "The Lights Go Out" (1983)
 "Julie Cries" (1984)
 "Across My Heart" (1984)
 "I Just Wanna" (1986)
 "Track 01" (1988)

Blue Angels

Albums
 Coming Out Of Nowhere (1993)

EPs
 Get It Back (1991)
 All The Way (1992)
 When It's Gone (1993)
"Blow"

Compilation albums
 HMV Unplugged: The Acoustic Sessions'' (1993) - "Candy"

Singles
 "Candy" (1991)
 "Loose" (1992)
 "Blow" (1994)

References

External links
Blue in Heaven in the Irish Music Database
Trouser Press Blue in Heaven profile
Supernaut review
Explicit Material cover
Blue in Heaven publicity pic
Blue in Heaven thread on "I Love Music"
Blue Angels in the Irish Music Database
New York Times articles
Blue in Heaven - Irish Punk & New Wave Discography
Blue Angels - Irish Punk & New Wave Discography
 https://isolations.blogspot.com/2019/02/our-interview-with-dave-clarke-about.html

Irish new wave musical groups
Musical groups established in 1982
Musical groups from Dublin (city)
1982 establishments in Ireland